Boulevardier from the Bronx is a 1936 Warner Bros. Merrie Melodies cartoon directed by Friz Freleng. The short was released on October 10, 1936.

Plot
Big-city baseball team with a cocky chicken pitcher named Dizzy Dan plays an exhibition baseball game in Hickville.

The townsfolk of Hickville are at the train stop awaiting Dizzy Dan and the Chicago Giants baseball team. However, the train was stopped a little late, so the townspeople pushed the train depot over to cheer for their honored guest.
A hen with a blue bonnet is swooned with Dizzy Dan, but her boyfriend Claude, carrying a gnarled bat for the match, grumbles at his girlfriend's idolizing.
Dizzy Dan plays the song Boulevardier from the Bronx to brag his likeness, with some clucking sounds.

Later, at the baseball match, Dizzy Dan is pitching. He lets the rest of his team back off as he prepares to pitch against a pig batter with a Babe Ruth Caricature. The first pitch was a strike (the ball sent the turtle catcher flying from the reaction), and Dizzy Dan cackles at the batter. Dan pitches again and Strike Two. At the third pitch, Dan struck the batter out, while the ingenious catcher uses a metal chimney pipe to return the ball back to the pitcher, with Dan cackling again.

At the next inning, Claude is pitching against a dachshund batter. He pitches, but nearly beans the batter for Ball One. Claude tries again, but the dachshund connects the hit. Claude tries to catch the ball, but many baseballs fell to the ground and ultimately dropped the chance for an out. The dachshund manages to stretch from base to base and has made a single run to the home base, leaving Claude scratching his head.

Later, Dizzy Dan is at bat while Claude is pitching. Dan arrogantly lets himself have two strikes and then he hits the ball, sending Claude to the back of the stadium wall, dropping the ball from the hard impact. The hen tries to tell Dan to run, but he is biding his time before he manages to complete a single run, along with a familiar cackle.

It's the last half of the inning and the Hickville team has 3 men on base and 2 outs (the score was 3–0, Giants). Dizzy Dan is pitching against Claude, who is getting really tensed in anger against the pitcher. Dan winds up and throws a fastball; Strike One. Dan then throws a slowball that is true to its name. Claude tries to swing it, but it curves for another strike; Dan cackles again. Then Dan pitches a hard fastball; that was when Claude makes a clean hit for a Grand Slam Home Run, conclusively winning the game.

And Claude gives Dizzy Dan the last cackle.

That's all, folks!

Notes
 This short is a parody of St. Louis Cardinals pitcher Dizzy Dean, and is loosely based on a song of the same name which was featured in the 1936 Warner Bros. musical film Colleen.
 This short is the first Merrie Melodies cartoon to feature the signature theme song, Merrily We Roll Along.
 This short is also the first Merrie Melodies cartoon to feature the 1936-37 Blue Color Rings and a Blue WB Shield in the opening titles.
 The scenes with a turtle playing catcher, the dachshund batter stretching from base to base, and a pig batter with the Babe Ruth caricature were reused in the 1940 Looney Tunes short, "Porky's Baseball Broadcast".
 The taunting cackle that Dizzy Dan and Claude uses, sounds similar to a horse. That particular sound was reused in later Looney Tunes cartoons and DePatie-Freleng cartoons.
 The hen with a blue bonnet appeared in two Merrie Melodies shorts, "Let It Be Me" and "A Star Is Hatched". She has an uncanny resemblance to Miss Prissy in the later cartoons.

References

External links
 
 Boulevardier from the Bronx on Big Cartoon Database

1936 films
1936 animated films
1936 comedy films
1930s sports films
Merrie Melodies short films
Warner Bros. Cartoons animated short films
Short films directed by Friz Freleng
American baseball films
Films scored by Carl Stalling
1930s Warner Bros. animated short films